Second Chances may refer to:

Music 
 Second Chances album, a 2013 album by Jessy J
 "Second Chances", a song by Gregory Alan Isakov

Television and film 
 Second Chances (film), a 1998 film  by James Fargo
 Second Chances (American TV series), a 1993 American soap opera that aired on CBS
 Second Chances (Philippine TV series), a 2015 Philippine drama series that aired on GMA Network
 "Second Chances" (Star Trek: The Next Generation), a 1993 episode of Star Trek: The Next Generation
 Second Chances, a 2010 television film by Jean-Claude Lord
 Second Chances, a 2013 Hallmark channel television film by Ernie Barbarash
 Second Chances, an AOL Original series
 Second Chances, a 1995 television special of the PBS show Shining Time Station
 "Second Chances" (Arrow), an episode of Arrow

Other uses 
 Second Chances, a novel in the Dark-Hunter series
 Second Chances, a 1996–2000 comic strip featuring Nick and Kate, neighbors of Tank McNamara

See also
 Second Chance (disambiguation)